Phalguni (Sanskrit for "reddish, red") may be:

 Phalguni river
 an asterism and lunar mansion in traditional Hindu astronomy and astrology, see Nakshatra#List of Nakshatras
 Phalguni Pathak, Indian singer